Meyer Rosenbaum was the spiritual leader of the Kehilla Adath Israel and the self-proclaimed Chief Rabbi of Cuba from 1948 to 1958, when he left for Venezuela, then Guatemala, and New York.

Biography
Rosenbaum was born on 12 August 1910 in Charnovitch (previously in Austro-Hungary), as  a son of Rebbe Isamar Rosenbaum. Rosenbaum left in 1933 for Palestine, where he learned in Hevron Yeshiva (Jerusalem). He received his rabbinic ordination in 1936, making him Isamar's only son who did not become a Hasidic rabbi. In 1937, he moved to New York and in 1948 Rosenbaum arrived in Cuba on a charity collection mission for the Israeli Irgun. He soon became the Rabbi of Adath Israel-K’neseth Israel, then later rabbi of the Patronato. 
	
Rosenbaum also was accomplished in the secular world. He attended the University of Vienna and New York University. In Cuba, he taught at the Universidad de la Habana.

When Rosenbaum was still associated with Kehilla Ahdut Israel (the combined Adath Israel and Kneseth Israel), he is the founder of orthodox Tahkemoni School  on 20 October 1949. Tajkemoni was an Orthodox yeshiva-type school with an enrollment of about 80 Ashkenazi pupils. It constituted a threat to the Centro Israelita and its Colegio, and it was probably responsible for some of the decline in enrollment at the Colegio. The principal was Yosef Abrami, who was present at the founding meeting of the Patronato. Abrami previously had taught in the Centro Israelita. He also authored many scholarly works in Hebrew, Yiddish, and Spanish.

See also
History of the Jews in Cuba
List of Latin American Jews
List of Cubans
Nadvorna
Ashkenazi Jews
Hasidic Judaism
Chief Rabbi

References

 Levinson, Jay. Jewish Community of Cuba: The Golden Years, 1906–1958, Westview Publishing Company, Nashville, Tennessee, (February 2006).   

1910 births
Austro-Hungarian emigrants to Cuba
Austro-Hungarian Jews
Cuban rabbis
20th-century rabbis
Rebbes of Nadvorna
Year of death missing
Burials at the Jewish cemetery on the Mount of Olives
Cuban Orthodox rabbis
Cuban people of Romanian-Jewish descent
Clergy from Chernivtsi
Romanian Ashkenazi Jews